Ceuthomadarus viduellus is a moth in the family Lecithoceridae. It was described by Rebel in 1903. It is found in Bulgaria and Greece.

References

Moths described in 1903
Ceuthomadarinae